Kristina Silich (born 15 May 1990) is a Belarusian badminton player.

Achievements

BWF International Challenge/Series (5 titles, 1 runner-up) 
Women's doubles

Mixed doubles

  BWF International Challenge tournament
  BWF International Series tournament
  BWF Future Series tournament

References

External links 
 
 
 

1990 births
Living people
Belarusian female badminton players
Badminton players at the 2019 European Games
European Games competitors for Belarus
20th-century Belarusian women
21st-century Belarusian women